Kouami N'Dri (born 6 April 1943) is an Ivorian sprinter. He competed in the 4 × 100 metres relay at the 1968 Summer Olympics and the 1972 Summer Olympics.

References

1943 births
Living people
Athletes (track and field) at the 1968 Summer Olympics
Athletes (track and field) at the 1972 Summer Olympics
Ivorian male sprinters
Olympic athletes of Ivory Coast
Place of birth missing (living people)